Vicente Orlando Huacón Alvarado (born April 5, 1989 in Guayaquil) is an amateur Greco-Roman wrestler from Ecuador. He competed for the 66 kg category (welterweight division) in men's Greco-Roman wrestling at the 2012 Summer Olympics in London, after winning the gold medal at the Pan American Qualification Tournament in Kissimmee, Florida, United States. Huacon was eliminated in the second qualifying round, against Egypt's Ashraf El-Gharably, with a technical score of 2–5, and a classification score of 1–3.

References

External links
 

1989 births
Living people
Wrestlers at the 2012 Summer Olympics
Olympic wrestlers of Ecuador
Ecuadorian male sport wrestlers
Sportspeople from Guayaquil
South American Games bronze medalists for Ecuador
South American Games medalists in wrestling
Competitors at the 2014 South American Games
21st-century Ecuadorian people